Battle of Winchester may refer to:

 First Battle of Winchester, on May 25, 1862 of Stonewall Jackson's Valley Campaign during the American Civil War
 Second Battle of Winchester, on June 13–15, 1863 as part of the Gettysburg Campaign during the American Civil War
 Third Battle of Winchester or Battle of Opequon, on September 19, 1864, during the Valley Campaigns of 1864